Glen Rock–Boro Hall is one of two railroad stations operated by New Jersey Transit in the borough of Glen Rock, Bergen County, New Jersey, United States on the Bergen County Line. Its name comes from the fact that the Glen Rock Municipal Building is located immediately east of the station, and to differentiate it from the Glen Rock–Main Line station, which lies two blocks west on Rock Road (County Route 134).

History
The station opened on October 1, 1881 as Paramus. The station was renamed in 1891.

Station layout

The station has two tracks, each with a low-level side platform. Although the platforms are not high-level, Boro Hall is handicap accessible via use of two ramps, one on either side of the platform. 

Pedestrian access to both platforms is available along Rock Road, and from a pedestrian underpass on Maple Avenue and the entrance to the station's parking lot on Glen Avenue. Paid parking is available by use of a ticket machine system; previously the borough employed parking meters.

The Boro Hall station is located three blocks from the Main Line station in Glen Rock.

Bibliography

References

External links

 Maple Avenue entrance from Google Maps Street View
 Station from Rock Road from Google Maps Street View

Railway stations in Bergen County, New Jersey
NJ Transit Rail Operations stations
Former Erie Railroad stations
1881 establishments in New Jersey
Railway stations opened in 1881